El Pinar is a Spanish term referring to a pine tree (Latin: pinus). As a proper name it probably originated in Aragonese. It may refer to:

 A Spanish family name
 Localities in Spain:
 El Pinar, Canary Islands (El Pinar de El Hierro)
 El Pinar, Granada, Andalusia
 El Pinar, Castellón (El Pinar del Grau), part of Castellón de la Plana, Valenciana
 Platja del Pinar, beach of El Pinar del Grau
 El Pinar, Almería, Andalusia
 El Pinar, Ávila, Castile and León
 El Pinar, Madrid
 El Pinar, Málaga, Andalusia
 El Pinar, Reus, part of Reus, Catalonia
 El Pinar, Rubí, part of Rubí, Barcelona, Catalonia
 El Pinar, Segovia, Castile and León
 Urbanització El Pinar, quarter in Castellvell del Camp, Province of Tarragona, Catalonia
 El Pinar, Uruguay, coastal resort in Canelones Department

See also
 Pinar (disambiguation)
 Pino (disambiguation)